Fairford is a town in Gloucestershire.

Fairford may also refer to:

Fairford, Alabama
Fairford, California
Fairford (electoral district), Manitoba
Fairford River, Manitoba

Aviation 
 RAF Fairford - Royal Air Force (RAF) station in Gloucestershire, England.